David Durham may refer to:

 David Anthony Durham (born 1969), American novelist
 David Durham (fugitive), American who shot a police officer and fled
 David Durham, pseudonym of William Edward Vickers (1889–1965), English writer